Giuseppe Mastroleo (died in Naples, 1744) was an Italian painter.

Biography
He was a pupil of Paolo De Matteis. He painted a St Erasmus for the church of Santa Maria la Nuova in Naples. He also painted for the Nunziatella of Pizzofalcone. One of his pupils was Josef Lujan Martinez from Zaragoza.

References

1744 deaths
18th-century Italian painters
Italian male painters
Painters from Naples
18th-century Italian male artists